A chloride channel blocker is a type of drug which inhibits the transmission of ions (Cl−) through chloride channels.

Niflumic acid is a chloride channel blocker that has been used in experimental scientific research. Another example is anthracene-9-carboxylic acid, a potent blocker of the CLCN1-type chloride channel found in skeletal muscle, which is used to study animal models of myotonia congenita.

See also 
 Chloride channel opener

References

Further reading 

 

 
 
 
 

Drugs
Ion channel blockers